Cibiru is one of the 30 districts of Bandung city in West Java, and the location of an Islamic school (UIN Sunan Gunung Djati) and Pharmacy School (Sekolah Tinggi Farmasi Bandung) near West Java district based Police

Districts of West Java
Bandung